Xerula megalospora is a species of gilled mushroom in the family Physalacriaceae.

Xerula megalospora fruit bodies occur on the ground, solitarily or in small groups. They are saprobic and found near the well-decayed stumps of oak or other broadleaf trees. The cap is viscid and colored smokey white to pale buff. Gills are adnate, white, and smooth. The flesh of Xerula megalospora is white, and the odor is sometimes described as being reminiscent of carrots. The spore print is white. The spores of this species are a distinguishing feature being a relatively large 18–23 by 11–14 μm. The botanical name megalospora means large-spored. The spore shape is citriniform (i.e., lemon shaped), the surface is finely roughened, and spores are non-amyloid. This species is widespread and fairly common in urban areas.

The species is edible although consists of little flesh.

References

Barron, George (1999). Mushrooms of Ontario and Eastern Canada.  Lone Pine Publishing, Edmonton. 
Roody, William C. (2003). Mushrooms of West Virginia and the Central Appalachians.  The University Press of Kentucky, Lexington. 

Fungi described in 1896
Fungi of North America
Physalacriaceae